The 2004–05 season of Ligue 1 was a very close-run battle. Separating fourth placed Rennes, who enter the UEFA Cup and 18th placed Caen, who get relegated to Ligue 2, were just 13 points. Lyon were long time leaders and had won the league back in April 2005. On the last day, 4 teams could have got the 4th place guaranteeing a place in the UEFA Cup and any 2 from 6 teams could have been relegated before the final games.

Participating teams

 Ajaccio
 Auxerre
 Bastia
 Bordeaux
 Caen
 Istres
 Lens
 Lille
 Lyon
 Marseille
 Metz
 Monaco
 Nantes
 Nice
 Paris Saint-Germain
 Rennes
 Saint-Étienne
 Sochaux
 Strasbourg
 Toulouse

League table

Results

Top goalscorers

Player of the month

References

External links
France 2004/05 at Rec.Sport.Soccer Statistics Foundation

Ligue 1 seasons
France
1